Into the Weeds is a Canadian documentary film, directed by Jennifer Baichwal and released in 2022. The film centres on Dewayne "Lee" Johnson, the California man whose health problems after longterm exposure to glyphosate in the herbicide product Roundup led to the landmark Johnson v. Monsanto Co. court case.

The film premiered as the opening film of the 2022 Hot Docs Canadian International Documentary Festival, in advance of a planned television broadcast by CBC Television in fall 2022 as an episode of The Passionate Eye.

References

External links
 

2022 films
2022 documentary films
Canadian documentary films
Films directed by Jennifer Baichwal
2020s English-language films
2020s Canadian films